Miss Universe Puerto Rico 2019 was the 64th edition of the Miss Universe Puerto Rico pageant. Kiara Ortega of Rincón crowned Madison Anderson of Toa Baja at the end of the event. Anderson represented Puerto Rico at the Miss Universe 2019 pageant and finished as 1st Runner-Up. Due to the COVID-19 pandemic the 2020 edition of the national pageant was cancelled, resulting in 1st Runner-Up Estefanía Soto of San Sebastián representing Puerto Rico at Miss Universe 2020 where she finished in the Top 10.

Result

Placements

* - Voted into the Top 16 via online voting

** - Voted into the Top 6 via Twitter voting

Special awards

Contestants
Official 28 candidates of Miss Universe Puerto Rico 2019:

See also

 Miss Universe Puerto Rico

References

2019
2019 beauty pageants